Paolo Bollini (born 1960)
is a Sammarinese politician. He is a member of the Sammarinese Socialist Party.
He has been a captain regent twice, from October 1998 until April 1999 and from April 2004 until October 2004.

References

1960 births
Living people
Captains Regent of San Marino
Members of the Grand and General Council
Sammarinese Socialist Party politicians